Television Hill is an American folk rock band from Baltimore, Maryland. Their influences include pre-war blues, jug bands, old-time music and a wealth American folk music as well as many other traditional music forms from around the globe. Their original compositions lay mostly in the realm of  creative folklore & mythology, drawing on narrative themes from folklore & myths from around the globe.  Their songs are unique and inventive - a love for words pushes each song through to its end.

Members
Rob Wilson is the Texas born lead singer & songwriter for Baltimore-based supergroup Television Hill. Rob was frontman for Ambiguous City upstarts Antenna Farm and guitarist & songwriter for legendary Maryland noise-rock band Tribal Voice. Rob has a B.A. in Philosophy of Science & Ancient Studies from UMBC. He served as editor of Baltimore's Gadfly Monthly Music Calendar (1996–1998) & was co-promoter of The Ottobar's Baltimore Antifolk Music Night in conjunction with Dave Heumann until late 2002. Rob builds custom electric guitars and is currently studying Discourse & Technology at the University of Baltimore. Rob also regularly co-writes lyrics with Heumann for Arbouretum.

Walker David Teret plays bass, guitar, keys & vocals and handles much of the arranging for the band. Walker has his own old-time country band called Walker & Jay. He also performs with Celebration and Mink Stole. Walker has performed in the past with Arbouretum, Anomoanon, Cass McCombs, Scarlett Johansson, Jim & Jenny, and many others.

David Bergander plays drums, percussion. steel guitar & vocals. David currently also drums for Celebration. David has performed in the past with Arbouretum, Cicaeda, Graham Lindsey, and Scarlett Johansson.

Dave Heumann plays guitar, bass, keys & vocals. Heumann is also frontman for Thrill Jockey Records recording artists Arbouretum & has performed with many different bands such as Will Oldham's Bonnie "Prince" Billy Band and Matt Sweeney, as well as with Anomoanon & Cass McCombs.

Auxiliary members include: Marc Berrong (Landspeedrecord!, Slow Jets), Nathan Bell (Lungfish, Human Bell), Tony Drummond (Celebration), Geoff Graham (Lower Dens), Mike Kuhl, and Geoff Danek (Antenna Farm, Desert Boys).

Recordings
Television Hill's first record, Twilight, was released by Teneral Records and distributed by Morphius in 2005. Twilight was recorded by Rob Girardi at Social Services Studios in Baltimore, MD. The opening track, 'Jewel of Texas' features Jennifer Hutt on fiddle. ' Bamako Express' features Beth Varden (Violet Hour) on backup vocals. Justin Lucas and Michael & Tony Lambright of Madagascar are featured on both 'Bamako Express' and 'Buttercup Maidens'.The album was released to favorable reviews:
Americana-UK Magazine called it, "Near Perfect" and also says "It is fractured, it is unfocused it is Godamn brilliant."
Splendid said, "Twilight is a hell of a dawn."
Altcountry.nl said, "Television Hill: een schitterende band."
Ear Candy Magazine: "I have to admit, their version of 'John The Revelator' is hands down the best version I’ve ever heard in my life. Fourteen folk, country, rock songs that make you feel like your listening to The Band fronted by Mick and Keith and everybody's been sipping from the mason jar."

In 2006 Television Hill recorded a live 8-song EP of their performance at Rodney Henry's Dangerously Delicious Pies in Baltimore, MD. Although it currently remains unreleased, it has been widely circulated among Television Hill's fan base. It features material from Twilight, My Name's Hardin and a forthcoming full-length recording tentatively titled Another Naked Hour.

Baltimore supergroup Television Hill and Friends Records are pleased to announce the much anticipated release of My Name's Hardin (FR008). This six song limited edition vinyl concept EP is due out in February 2013 and takes a poke at the title of Bob Dylan's 1967 release John Wesley Harding. My name's Hardin is a musical biography that explores the life and lore of the fastest gun in the West, Wes Hardin, also paying equal homage to Dylan's recording and Johnny Cash's double concept album Sings the Ballads of the True West. Drawing from Hardin's autobiography, his Letters from Prison and an assortment of other relevant biographical material, Television Hill examines the Wes Hardin of legend & song, serving up savory mesquite seasoned tales of pride, bloodlust, and a cycle of violence that would ultimately consume the legendary Texas outlaw. Cowtown caterwauling, gritty guitars and rolling hill country rhythms cleverly coalesce to re-create the cattle trails, jail cells and whiskey soaked saloons of the Reconstruction Era South in this half-hour epic. The band's all-star line-up on this recording consists of singer/songwriter Rob Wilson, Arbouretum's Dave Heumann, Celebration's David Bergander and Walker Teret, with additional performances by Tony Drummond.

In 2010 the band also began recording Pieces of Eight with old friend Rob Girardi at Lord Baltimore Recording. A raucous eight song romp through the sandy shoals of the Eastern Seaboard and beyond. This lively exploration of tales & legends of Blackbeard, Captain Kidd, Tommy Tew and other  salty dogs will also include some special guest performances.

Discography

Albums
2005: Twilight TNRL001
2014: Another Naked Hour TBA

EPs
2013: My Name's Hardin  FR008
2013: Pieces of Eight   TBA

External links
Television Hill on FaceBook
Television Hill website
Television Hill on MySpace
Television Hill on WYPRs The Signal
Television Hill on YouTube
Television Hill on Vimeo
Friends Records

Rock music groups from Maryland
Musical groups from Baltimore
American folk rock groups